is a 2011 2D arcade fighting game developed by Examu. It is a joint collaboration between Aquaplus and Leaf, who developed all the titles and featured characters. The "Dream Match" in the title references the characters of the game coming together from various Aquaplus titles, including Utawarerumono, Tears to Tiara, and To Heart.

The game was released in Japan on June 22, 2011, with a PlayStation 3 version later released on August 30, 2012, followed by a U.S. release on November 19, 2013. Two updated versions called Aquapazza Version 1.5A and Aquapazza Version 2.0 added several new characters. Aquapazza and Version 2.0 were among the featured titles at the 2011 and 2012 Tougeki tournament.

Characters
From Utawarerumono
  Player
  Player 
  Player
  Player, Added in Aquapazza Version 2.0
  Partner
  Partner

From Tears to Tiara
  Player
  Player
  Player
  Partner
  Partner
  Partner, Added in Aquapazza Version 2.0

From To Heart, To Heart 2 and To Heart 2: Dungeon Travelers
  Player
  Player
  Player
  Player
  Player, Added in Aquapazza Version 1.5A
  Partner
  Partner, Boss
  Partner, Added in Aquapazza Version 2.0

From Kizuato
  Player (Added in Aquapazza Version 2.0), Boss (Added in PlayStation 3 version)

From Routes
  Partner

From Comic Party
  Partner
  Partner, Added in Aquapazza Version 1.5A

From White Album
  Partner
  Partner

Reception

The PlayStation 3 version received "generally favorable reviews" according to the review aggregation website Metacritic.

Bradly Hale of Hardcore Gamer said that "It may lack high-class refinement in certain areas, and the cast of fighters probably won’t be recognizable to those outside of the Japanese gaming scene, but those issues are incredibly minor when put up against the bigger picture — which in this case is a sound, robust fighting game." Mandi Odoerfer of GameZone praised the game's Active Emotion System, saying that it "eliminates some of the fighting genre's biggest annoyances".  In Japan, Famitsu gave it a score of two sevens and two sixes for a total of 26 out of 40.

References

External links
 Official Japanese Website
 Official North American Website
 

2011 video games
Arcade video games
Crossover fighting games
Doujin video games
Fighting games used at the Super Battle Opera tournament
PlayStation 3 games
NESiCAxLive games
Video games developed in Japan
Aquaplus games
Examu games